Balatonmáriafürdő is a village located on the southern shore of Lake Balaton in Somogy county, Hungary.

Public life

Mayors
 1990-1994: László  Szirják (Baráti Kör Egyesülete)
 1994-1998: László Szirják (független)
 1998-2002: László Szirják (független)
 2002-2006: Dr. Sándor Bollók (független)
 2006-2010: György Vince Galácz (független)
 2010-2014: György Vince Galácz (független)
 2014-2019: György Vince Galácz (független)
 2019-től: György Vince Galácz (független)

External links 
 Street map (Hungarian)

References 

Populated places in Somogy County